South Meadow Pond is a  pond in Carver, Massachusetts, United States. The pond is located southwest of Plymouth Municipal Airport. The pond is the gateway to South Meadow Village, a community limited to people age 55 and over. It has an abundance of pickerel, some ranging to 24 inches.  It is a very weedy pond, difficult to fish and best fished from a canoe.

External links
Environmental Protection Agency

Ponds of Plymouth County, Massachusetts
Ponds of Massachusetts